Kuhn is a lunar impact crater located on the lunar far side near the Northern lunar pole. The crater is located east of the Kocher crater, Southeast of the prominent Ashbrook crater and just north of the southern lunar pole. Kuhn was adopted and named after German chemist Richard Kuhn by the IAU in 2008.

References

External links 
 LAC-144 area – Map of southern lunar pole

Impact craters on the Moon